The borough of Worthing, one of seven local government districts in the English county of West Sussex, has 49 extant, operating churches and other places of worship.  Sixteen other former places of worship are still in existence but are no longer in religious use.  The district, on the south coast of England, is mostly urban: it consists of the seaside resort of Worthing, established in the 19th century, and its residential suburbs, ranging from ancient villages absorbed by the growing town to housing estates built after World War II.

Most residents identify themselves as Christian, and there is only one non-Christian place of worship, a mosque.  The Church of England, the country's officially established church, is represented by more churches than any other denomination, but Worthing's first church was an Independent chapel.  Protestant Nonconformism flourished in the early 19th century during the town's early development, while Roman Catholic worship (after the Catholic Emancipation) took root somewhat later.

English Heritage has awarded listed status to 12 of Worthing's extant churches and two former church buildings.  A building is defined as "listed" when it is placed on a statutory register of buildings of "special architectural or historic interest" in accordance with the Planning (Listed Buildings and Conservation Areas) Act 1990. The Department for Culture, Media and Sport, a Government department, is responsible for this; English Heritage, a non-departmental public body, acts as an agency of the department to administer the process and advise the department on relevant issues. There are three grades of listing status. Grade I, the highest, is defined as being of "exceptional interest"; Grade II* is used for "particularly important buildings of more than special interest"; and Grade II, the lowest, is used for buildings of "special interest".

Overview of Worthing and its places of worship

It is bordered to the west and north by the district of Arun, to the east by the district of Adur, and to the south by the English Channel.

The town of Worthing began as a development in the south of the parish of Broadwater, a manor of Saxon origin which at the time of the Domesday survey in 1086 was held by the Norman nobleman William de Braose, 1st Lord of Bramber. What began as a modest fishing village quickly grew into a popular residential area, helped by the concurrent development of fashionable Brighton further along the coast. Worthing absorbed Broadwater and other ancient centres such as Goring, Heene and West Tarring during the 19th century, and was incorporated as a borough in 1890.

The old villages had their own Anglican churches; Worthing itself was served by St Mary's Church in Broadwater until a chapel of ease, St Paul's, was built in 1812. It quickly became "the spiritual and social centre around which ... the town developed", despite financial difficulties and complaints that it failed to serve Worthing's poor. Several other Anglican churches were founded in the town centre during the 19th century, starting with Christ Church—which also started as a chapel of ease to St Mary's before it received its own parish. Declining congregations have resulted in overcapacity, and Christ Church was threatened with closure in 2006.

The first place of worship in Worthing, however, was an Independent chapel on the present Montague Street (formerly Cross Lane). Long since demolished and now the site of a shop, it was founded in 1804, and was rebuilt and re-established as a Congregational church in 1842 by Reverend L. Winchester, the founder of Congregationalism in the town. Nonconformism thrived in the early town.  Various Independent and Evangelical congregations became established; Wesleyan Methodism was first recorded in 1811, and Primitive Methodism in 1865; Baptist meetings were held from 1878, and a Strict Baptist chapel existed from 1907; Brethren registered their first place of worship in 1892, and subsequently occupied various buildings; and many other denominations have been—and in some cases still are—represented. Roman Catholicism took until the middle of the 19th century to become established.  The first permanent church, St Mary of the Angels, was opened in 1864; before that, Mass was celebrated in a local resident's private chapel and in the Sisters of Notre Dame de Sion's convent. St Mary of the Angels was parished from 1918, and the ministry grew substantially under the leadership of Canon James Purdon, its priest for 53 years. Other parishes were established in 1927 (Durrington; later moved to High Salvington), 1958 (East Worthing) and 1970 (Goring-by-Sea).  The latter church, dedicated to the English Martyrs, is of little architectural merit but has one remarkable feature: a two-thirds scale replica of the Sistine Chapel ceiling, hand-painted by an untrained artist in six years.
WORTHING is mentioned in Samuel Enderby II's 1797 will by a bequest to a rev. Mr. Jones minister Worthing Surrey; was this Surrey part of Sussex or another Worthing in 1797. The Will also makes bequests to other Presbyterians, notably to Hugh Worthington, Pastor of Salters Hall, London. The Jones bequest suggests that Worthing had Presbyterian Religion in the 18th. Century.

Mission halls
Worthing's Anglican churches established many mission halls—rudimentary chapels of ease administered by the founding church and serving newly developed residential areas—during the 19th and early 20th centuries.  The town's haphazard, piecemeal, intermittently rapid residential development meant that such structures, which could be erected quickly, were needed to provide worship facilities until a more permanent arrangement could be made. All fell out of use or were replaced by a permanent church, but some of the buildings still stand.

Religious affiliation
According to the 2001 United Kingdom Census, 97,568 people lived in the borough of Worthing.  Of these, 72.14% identified themselves as Christian, 0.75% were Muslim, 0.34% were Buddhist, 0.26% were Jewish, 0.22% were Hindu, 0.11% were Sikh, 0.46% followed a religion other than these, 16.99% claimed no religious affiliation and 8.73% did not state their religion. The proportion of Christians was slightly higher than the 71.74% in England as a whole; Buddhism and other religions were also practised more widely in Worthing than nationally. Islam, Hinduism, Judaism and Sikhism had significantly fewer followers than average: in 2001, 3.1% of people in England were Muslim, 1.1% were Hindu, 0.7% were Sikh and 0.5% were Jewish.  The proportion of people with no religious affiliation was higher than the national figure of 14.59%.

Administration
All Anglican churches in the borough of Worthing are part of the Diocese of Chichester, whose cathedral is at Chichester in West Sussex. The Rural Deanery of Worthing—one of five deaneries in the Archdeaconry of Chichester, which is in turn one of three archdeaconries in the diocese—covers the borough in its entirety and includes some churches in neighbouring districts.

The Roman Catholic Diocese of Arundel and Brighton, whose cathedral is at Arundel, administers the four Roman Catholic churches in Worthing.  Worthing Deanery, one of 13 deaneries in the diocese, includes the parishes of Goring (Church of the English Martyrs), East Worthing (St Charles Borromeo Church, and a church in Lancing in the neighbouring district of Adur) and Worthing (St Mary of the Angels Church in central Worthing and St Michael's Church in High Salvington), as well as other parishes outside the borough.

Current places of worship

Former places of worship

See also
Listed buildings in Worthing
List of demolished places of worship in West Sussex

Notes

References

Bibliography

 
Worthing
Worthing
 
Lists of buildings and structures in West Sussex